Nuusafee Island is a small, uninhabited island in Samoa.
The island is located off the southeast coast of Upolu Island, near the Upolu village of Poutasi.

See also

 Samoa Islands
 List of islands
 Desert island

References

Uninhabited islands of Samoa
Atua (district)